Laura Pauliina Malmivaara (born 26 October 1973) is a Finnish actress. Her acting career began in 1993, and includes dozens of roles in film and television productions, as well as stage appearances. In addition to acting, she has also worked as a singer, photographer, television host, blogger, and model.

Career

Early life and education 
Prior to her acting career, she worked as a model in her youth. In 2002, Malmivaara graduated from the Helsinki Theatre Academy. She has also studied photography at the School of Arts, Design and Architecture in Helsinki and theology at the University of Helsinki.

Acting career: 1993–present 
Malmivaara made her debut as an actress in the 1993 film Harjunpää and the Persecutors and has since then acted in dozens of Finnish film and television productions. Malmivaara is also known for her role in the drama television series Kotikatu, in which she played the priest Tuija Kangasharju from 2002 to 2012.

Onstage 

Musical career debut in 2005 
Malmivaara's debut album, was released in 2005 by Elements Music. The ten-track album consists of pop songs, and before and after its release, the singles "Nukkumaan" and "Myytävänä elämä" were released in 2005 and 2006, respectively. "Nukkumaan" peaked at number seventeen on the Official Finnish Singles Chart, whereas the single "Myytävänä elämä" did not make it to the chart. Before her recording career, Malmivaara performed the song "Daa da daa da" with other actors in the film Restless and wrote and performed the song "Sadepilvet" for the film Lovers & Leavers.

Photography 
In addition to her film acting career, Malmivaara has worked as a still photographer for a number of films, and furthermore, three exhibitions featuring her photographic works have been held: Mikä minusta tulee isona (2004), Lauran matkakuvia: Tukholma (2012, 2013), and Taiteilijakuvia (2015).

Non-fiction television 
Malmivaara has hosted two televisions programs. She hosted Peili, a show based on a board game, that ran for two seasons and aired on MTV3 AVA from 2009 to 2010. From 2012 to 2013, Malmivaara hosted the travel series  that ran for two seasons on Liv. In the series' every episode, she travelled to the city of Stockholm with an alternating celebrity guest.

In 2017, Malmivaara participated in the tenth season of Tanssii tähtien kanssa, the Finnish version of Dancing with the Stars, with the dancer  as her partner.

Blogging 
Malmivaara blogged frequently for the women's magazine , which was published by Bonnier Publications Oy from 2010 to 2013.

Personal life 
Malmivaara's younger brother, Olli, is a former professional ice hockey player, and the actress and singer Malla Malmivaara (also born Laura Malmivaara) is her second cousin.

Malmivaara has two daughters—born in 2004 and 2006—with the director Aku Louhimies, to whom she was married from 2003 to 2012. She lives in Helsinki.

Filmography

Feature film performances

Television

Still photography

Discography

Albums 
  (2005)

Singles 
 "Nukkumaan" (2005) – peaked at #17 on the Official Finnish Singles Chart
 "Myytävänä elämä" (2006)

Photography exhibitions 
 Mikä minusta tulee isona (2004)
 Lauran matkakuvia: Tukholma (2012, 2013)
 Taiteilijakuvia (2015)

References

External links 
 
 
 

1973 births
Living people
20th-century Finnish actresses
20th-century Finnish photographers
21st-century Finnish actresses
Finnish bloggers
Finnish expatriates in Greece
Finnish female models
21st-century Finnish women singers
Finnish film actresses
Finnish photographers
Finnish women photographers
Finnish pop singers
Finnish television actresses
Finnish television presenters
Finnish stage actresses
Movie stills photographers
People from Kajaani
Finnish women bloggers
Finnish women television presenters
20th-century women photographers
21st-century women photographers